Raffaele Sannitz (born May 18, 1983, in Lugano, Switzerland) is a Swiss former professional ice hockey Left wing who most notably played with HC Lugano of the National League (NL). He competed for Switzerland at the 2010 Winter Olympics.

Career statistics

Regular season and playoffs

International

References

External links

1983 births
Living people
Columbus Blue Jackets draft picks
Dayton Bombers players
EHC Kloten players
HC Lugano players
Ice hockey players at the 2010 Winter Olympics
Olympic ice hockey players of Switzerland
Sportspeople from Lugano
Syracuse Crunch players
Swiss ice hockey left wingers